A playboy lifestyle is the lifestyle of a wealthy man with ample time for leisure, who demonstratively is a bon vivant who appreciates the pleasures of the world, especially the company of women. The term "playboy" was popular in the early to mid-20th century and is sometimes used to describe a conspicuous womanizer.

Development

Initially the term was used in the eighteenth century for boys who performed in the theatre, and later it appears in the 1888 Oxford Dictionary to characterize a person with money who is out to enjoy himself. By the end of the nineteenth century it also implied the connotations of "gambler" and "musician". By 1907, in J. M. Synge's comedy The Playboy of the Western World,  the term had acquired the notion of a womanizer. According to Shawn Levy, the term reached its full meaning in the interwar years and early post WWII years. Postwar intercontinental travel allowed playboys to meet at international nightclubs and famous "playgrounds" such as the Riviera or Palm Beach where they were trailed by paparazzi who supplied the tabloids with material to be fed to an eager audience. Their sexual conquests were rich, beautiful, and famous. In 1953, Hugh Hefner caught the wave and created the Playboy magazine.

Famous playboys 
Porfirio Rubirosa, who died in a car crash in 1965, is an example of someone who embodied the playboy lifestyle. The diplomat claimed to have no time to work, being busy spending time with women, getting married briefly and in sequence to the two richest women in the world, drinking and gambling with his friends, playing polo, racing cars, and flying his airplane from party to party. He was linked to other famous playboys of the time Aly Khan, Jorge Guinle, "Baby" Francisco Pignatari, and later, Gunther Sachs, his acolyte, who termed himself a homo ludens.

Other people who adopted the playboy lifestyle included Alfonso de Portago, Barry Sheene, Hugh Hefner, Dan Bilzerian, Julio Iglesias, George Best, Imran Khan, James Hunt, Howard Hughes, Averell Harriman, Errol Flynn, Gianni Agnelli, Silvio Berlusconi, John F. Kennedy, Alessandro "Dado" Ruspoli, Carlos de Beistegui, Count Theodore Zichy, David Frost, Bernard Cornfeld, Wilt Chamberlain, George Clooney, Maurizio Zanfanti and Mario Conde.

Fictional playboys include  James Bond from the James Bond franchise, Patrick Melrose from Patrick Melrose, Bruce Wayne from the DC Comics Batman franchise, Tony Stark from Marvel Entertainment, Jack Donaghy from 30 Rock, Foghorn Leghorn from The Looney Tunes Show, and Charlie Harper from Two and a Half Men.

See also

Café society
Casanova
Don Juanism
Hedonism
Jet set
Libertine
Luxury
Rake
Socialite

Notes

References
 .

External links
Sandra Ballentine's 2001 Time line of rakes and playboys

Men and sexuality
Sexuality and society
Stock characters
Stereotypes of men
Lifestyles